The 1st Parliament of Upper Canada was opened 17 September 1792.  Elections in Upper Canada had been held in August 1792. All sessions were held at Navy Hall in Newark, later Niagara-on-the-Lake.  This parliament was dissolved 1 July 1796.

This House of Assembly of the 1st Parliament of Upper Canada had five sessions 17 September 1792 to 3 June 1796:

See also
Legislative Council of Upper Canada
Executive Council of Upper Canada
Legislative Assembly of Upper Canada
Lieutenant Governors of Upper Canada, 1791–1841
Historical federal electoral districts of Canada
List of Ontario provincial electoral districts

References

Further reading
Handbook of Upper Canadian Chronology, Frederick H. Armstrong, Toronto : Dundurn Press, 1985. 

01
1792 establishments in Upper Canada
1796 disestablishments in Upper Canada